Soviet submarine K-56 was a K-class submarine of the Soviet Navy during World War II operating with the Baltic Fleet.

Operational history 
Entered in service after the German invasion, she saw active service late during the war.

Additionally, K-56 torpedoed and damaged the German merchant Baltenland(3038 GRT) off Poland on 26 December 1944.

Fate 
Sunk in 1957 at nuclear trials.

References 

1940 ships
Ships built in the Soviet Union
Soviet K-class submarines
World War II submarines of the Soviet Union